XVALA is a contemporary artist who is known for using controversial celebrity images and artifacts in his work and for his "Fear Google" campaign addressing loss of privacy in the Internet Age. The artist has cited his concerns about the public nature of personal information in the Internet Age as the driving force behind the campaign but also says that he does not believe in censorship. XVALA describes his work as belonging to the "Post-PC era".

Identity
XVALA's real name is often reported to be Jeff Hamilton but this claim is disputed. The name "XVALA" is an internet tag created by the artist for the purpose of exclusivity. The XVALA tag was not originally tied to any URL or email address and generated zero search results. XVALA gave meaning to the tag by creating unique content that eventually connected to the internet through search engines.

Controversy

One of XVALA's earliest and most enduring uses of a controversial celebrity image was the display of a photo of Britney Spears with her head shaved, taken by paparazzi in 2007 and later placed online, where the artist found it. In 2011, he used nude photos of Scarlett Johansson that had been hacked from the actress' phone and leaked publicly online, posting multiple copies of the photos in public areas across Los Angeles with "Fear Google" stickers covering her breasts and buttocks. He called his use of these types of images a "disruptive innovation". Later that same year, he used garbage gathered from the homes of tech industry pioneers Mark Zuckerberg, Larry Page and Sergey Brin, Steve Jobs, Jack Dorsey, and Jimmy Wales to create an exhibit called "The Not Very Well Hung Hangers of Silicon Valley". The name of the exhibit comes from its cornerstone piece, a wire hanger from Mark Zuckerberg's trash that XVALA painted Facebook Blue and bent into a phallic shape.

In 2012, XVALA used garbage collected from the home of Steve Jobs, along with a mold formed by the Chinese company M.I.C. Gadget, to create a sculpture of the Apple CEO. He then produced multiple copies in both Apple White and Apple Black (intended to represent the 2010 suicides at Foxconn) and sold them as part of his "Think Different" exhibit. The project was doubly controversial because M.I.C Gadget had already twice been forced to halt production of the sculptures due to cease and desist lawsuits brought against the company by Apple. XVALA also created art from Kim Kardashian's garbage in 2012, appropriating a deflated basketball and using it to create a piece titled "Slammed and Dunked".

XVALA gained international attention in major media outlets in 2014 due to his plan to use nude photos of Jennifer Lawrence and Kate Upton at his "No Delete" exhibit in St. Petersburg, Florida. The photos had originally been stolen from storage in the cloud and leaked online. Both XVALA and his publicist, Cory Allen, denied that the exhibit was intended to be exploitative and, on the contrary, was meant to open discussions about the nature of celebrity and art especially with relation to questions of privacy, freedom of speech, and content ownership. Nevertheless, the exhibit ignited backlash in the form of petitions and a boycott. Due to a combination of legal and ethical concerns, XVALA later decided not to use the photos of nude celebrities and substituted pictures of his own naked body.

Artistic comparisons
XVALA has been compared, for both positive and negative reasons, to a number of prominent artists. Due to his tendency toward appropriation art, he is often compared to Marcel Duchamp, Andy Warhol, and Richard Prince. He also has been compared to Banksy for his occasional forays into street art.

See also
 Imagery of nude celebrities
 iCloud leaks of celebrity photos

Notes and references

External links
 Official XVALA website
 XVALA gallery at Cory Allen Contemporary Art

Year of birth missing (living people)
Living people
American contemporary artists